The 2007–08 season was FK Partizan's 2nd season in Serbian SuperLiga. This article shows player statistics and all matches (official and friendly) that the club played during the 2007–08 season.

Tournaments

Players

Squad information

Competitions

Overview

Serbian SuperLiga

League table

Matches

Serbian Cup

UEFA Cup

UEFA expelled Partizan from the 2007–08 UEFA Cup due to crowd trouble at their away tie in Mostar, which forced the match to be interrupted for 10 minutes. UEFA adjudged travelling Partizan fans to have been the culprits of the trouble, but Partizan were allowed to play the return leg while the appeal was being processed. However, Partizan's appeal was rejected so Zrinjski Mostar qualified.

Trofeo Santiago Bernabéu

References

External links
 Official website
 Partizanopedia 2007-2008  (in Serbian)

FK Partizan seasons
Partizan
Serbian football championship-winning seasons